Marisol del Olmo is a Mexican telenovela actress.

Filmography

Awards and nominations

Premios TVyNovelas

External links 

Living people
Actresses from Mexico City
Mexican telenovela actresses
Mexican television actresses
1975 births